Papikyan is a surname. Notable people with the surname include:

Aghvan Papikyan (born 1994), Polish-born Armenian footballer
Arsen Papikyan (born 1972), Russian footballer and manager
Suren Papikyan (born 1986), Armenian politician